Li Xilin (born 2 October 1930) is a general in the People's Liberation Army of China who served as commander of the Guangzhou Military Region from 1992 to 1996.

He was a delegate to the 7th National People's Congress. He was a member of the Standing Committee of the 9th Chinese People's Political Consultative Conference. He was a member of the 14th Central Committee of the Chinese Communist Party.

Biography
Li was born Li Ruilin in Ji County (now Jizhou District, Hengshui), Hebei, on 2 October 1930. He enlisted in the People's Liberation Army (PLA) in December 1945, and joined the Chinese Communist Party (CCP) in September 1947. He served in South Hebei Military District before serving in various administrative of Hubei province. In 1954, he was assigned to the Guangzhou Military Region. He moved up the ranks to become deputy chief of staff in 1983 and chief of staff in 1985. In April 1990, he became deputy commander, rising to commander in October 1992.

He was promoted to the rank of lieutenant general (zhongjiang) in September 1988 and general (shangjiang) in May 1994.

References

 

1930 births
Living people
People from Hengshui
People's Liberation Army generals from Hebei
People's Republic of China politicians from Hebei
Chinese Communist Party politicians from Hebei
Delegates to the 7th National People's Congress
Members of the Standing Committee of the 9th Chinese People's Political Consultative Conference
Members of the 14th Central Committee of the Chinese Communist Party